Under the Angels is the tenth studio album by the British singer-songwriter Judie Tzuke, released in 1996.

It was the first of Tzuke's albums to be published on her newly founded home record label, Big Moon Records.

Track listing
All songs by Judie Tzuke and Bob Noble, except where indicated

 "Two Mountains" – 4:55
 "Parallel Lives" (Tzuke, Jonn Savannah) – 4:02
 "I Never Liked the Way You Looked" – 3:52
 "Under the Angels" – 5:53
 "Bad Dream" – 4:34
 "Life in a Bottle" – 4:03
 "Shouting at the Big Wall" – 4:41
 "Don't Let Me Sleep" (Tzuke, Mike Paxman) – 3:35
 "Without Love" – 4:26
 "Joan of Arc" – 6:21

Personnel
Judie Tzuke – vocals
Mike Paxman – guitars, keyboards, engineer, producer
Jolyon Dixon, Graham Kearn – guitars
Bob Noble – keyboards
Jonn Savannah – keyboards, dulcimer, backing vocals
Peter Gordeno – keyboards
Paul Muggleton – keyboards, percussion, engineer, producer
Phil Spalding – bass guitar
Andy Newmark – drums
Andy Hamilton – saxophone

Production
Mark Evans – engineer
Oskar Pall – mixing, mastering

References
Official website

Judie Tzuke albums
1996 albums
Albums produced by Mike Paxman